ISO/IEC 8859-7:2003, Information technology — 8-bit single-byte coded graphic character sets — Part 7: Latin/Greek alphabet, is part of the ISO/IEC 8859 series of ASCII-based standard character encodings, first edition published in 1987. It is informally referred to as Latin/Greek. It was designed to cover the modern Greek language. The original 1987 version of the standard had the same character assignments as the Greek national standard ELOT 928, published in 1986. The table in this article shows the updated 2003 version which adds three characters (0xA4: euro sign U+20AC, 0xA5: drachma sign U+20AF, 0xAA: Greek ypogegrammeni U+037A). Microsoft has assigned code page 28597 a.k.a. Windows-28597 to ISO-8859-7 in Windows.
IBM has assigned code page 813 to ISO 8859-7.
(IBM CCSID 813 is the original encoding.
CCSID 4909 adds the euro sign.
CCSID 9005 further adds the drachma sign and ypogegrammeni.)

ISO-8859-7 is the IANA preferred charset name for this standard (formally the 1987 version, but in practice there is no problem using it for the current version, as the changes are pure additions to previously unassigned codes) when supplemented with the C0 and C1 control codes from ISO/IEC 6429.

Unicode is preferred for Greek in modern applications, especially as UTF-8 encoding on the Internet. Unicode provides many more glyphs for complete coverage, see Greek alphabet in Unicode and Ancient Greek Musical Notation for tables.

Codepage layout

See also
Windows-1253
ISO 5428
ELOT 927

References

External links
ISO/IEC 8859-7:1999 - 8-bit single-byte coded graphic character sets, Part 7: Latin/Greek alphabet (draft dated June 10, 1999; superseded by ISO/IEC 8859-7:2003, published October 10, 2003)
Standard ECMA-118: 8-Bit Single-Byte Coded Graphic Character Sets - Latin/Greek Alphabet (December 1986)
ISO-IR 126  Right-hand Part of Latin/Greek Alphabet (November 30, 1986; superseded by ISO-IR 227)
ISO-IR 227 Right-hand Part of Latin/Greek Alphabet (July 28, 2003)

ISO/IEC 8859
Computer-related introductions in 1987